Nasusina is a genus of moths in the family Geometridae.

Species
Nasusina inferior (Hulst, 1896)
Nasusina mendicata (Barnes & McDunnough, 1918)
Nasusina minuta (Hulst, 1896)
Nasusina vallis Ferris, 2004
Nasusina vaporata (Pearsall, 1912)

References

External links

Eupitheciini